Hypercompe ganglio is a moth of the  family Erebidae. It is found in Brazil.

References

 Natural History Museum Lepidoptera generic names catalog

Hypercompe
Moths described in 1881